Jixi County (Jixihua pronunciation:   jie' cii xin) is a county under the administration of the prefecture-level city of Xuancheng, in the southeast of Anhui province, China, bordering Zhejiang province to the east. Jixi County is a hilly region with many rivers and bodies of water.

History
Huayang Town, under the administration of Jixi County, was well known during the Han Dynasty (208 BCE–220 CE). Jixi County was formally established in 776 CE during the Tang Dynasty. It formed part of the Huizhou region. In early European accounts, it was romanized Tsiki.

Administration
Jixi County has jurisdiction over eight towns and three townships.
Towns

Townships
Jiapeng Township
Jingzhou Township
Banqiaotou Township

Climate

Transportation

Rail
Jixi is served by the Anhui–Jiangxi Railway and Jixi North railway station on the Hefei–Fuzhou high-speed railway and the Hangzhou–Huangshan intercity railway.

Residents
Famous people from Jixi County include:
 Hu Zongxian the Ming dynasty Minister of War
 Hu Xueyan businessman
 Hu Shih scholar
 Hu Jintao General Secretary of the Chinese Communist Party

References

County-level divisions of Anhui
Xuancheng